Nilo Syrtis (or Nilosyrtis) is a region just north of Syrtis Major Planum on Mars, at approximately 23°N, 76°E and an elevation of −0.5 km. It marks a region of transition  (a "crustal dichotomy") between southern highland and northern lowland terrain, and consists of isolated peaks and mesas. On average, the drop in elevation  between the two terrains is 5,500 meters (18,000 feet).

Mars Science Laboratory 

Nilosyrtis is one of the sites proposed as a landing site for the Mars Science Laboratory.  However, it did not make the final cut.  It was in the top 7, but not in the top 4.
The aim of the Mars Science Laboratory is to search for signs of ancient life.  It is hoped that a later mission could then return samples from sites identified as probably containing remains of life.  To safely bring the craft down, a 12-mile-wide, smooth, flat circle is needed.  Geologists hope to examine places where water once ponded.  They would like to examine sediment layers.

Gallery

References

Surface features of Mars
Syrtis Major quadrangle